McFadden is a Scottish and Irish patronymic surname, meaning "son of little Patrick," named after St. Patrick, Ireland's patron saint. The Celtic prefix "Mc" means "son of", while "Fadden" is derived from the Gaelic Páidín, meaning "little Patrick". There are variant spellings, including Irish McFaddin, MacFadden, Mac Phaidin, the Scottish McFadin, McFadyen, MacFadyen, McFadwyn, McFadyean, MacFadzean, McFadyon, McFayden, Fadden, Fadyen, Faden, Fadin, and Fadwyn. McFadden is uncommon as a given name. People with the surname include:

 Andrew McFadden, Australian rugby league football coach
 Bernarr Macfadden (1868–1955), American proponent of physical culture
 Bob McFadden (1923‒2000), American singer, impressionist, and voice-over actor
 Brian McFadden (born 1980), Irish singer
 Bryant McFadden (born 1981), American football player
 Callum McFadden, Bassist with the band Hooton Tennis Club
 Charlie "Specks" McFadden (1895–1966), American country blues singer and songwriter
 Claron McFadden, American soprano
 Cynthia McFadden, correspondent for the American Broadcasting Company
 Cyra McFadden, American writer
 Daniel McFadden (born 1937), economist, Nobel laureate
 Darren McFadden, American football player
 David McFadden, Canadian poet
 David Henry McFadden, Manitoban politician
 David James McFadden, Ontario politician
 Eric McFadden, American musician
 Gabrielle McFadden, Irish politician
 Gates McFadden (born 1949), American actor and choreographer
 Gene McFadden (1949–2006), American singer and songwriter
 Hugh McFadden (poet) (born 1942), Irish poet, critic, literary editor, journalist
 Hugh McFadden (Gaelic footballer), Irish Gaelic footballer
 James McFadden (born 1983), Scottish footballer
 Jerry Walter McFadden (1948–1999), American serial killer and sex offender
 Jim McFadden, hockey player
 Johnjoe McFadden, Irish academic
 Joe McFadden, Scottish actor
 Joseph P. McFadden (1947–2013), American Roman Catholic bishop
 Ken McFadden, American basketball player 
 Kenny McFadden, American basketball player who played and coaches in New Zealand
 Louis Thomas McFadden, member of the U.S. House of Representatives
 Lucy-Ann McFadden (born 1952), American astronomer.
 Margaret Bischell McFadden, American philanthropist and social worker
 Mark McFadden, television news journalist
 Mary McFadden, American fashion designer
 Micah McFadden (born 2000), American football player
 Nicky McFadden, Irish politician
 Pat McFadden (British politician), British politician, member of Parliament
 Patrick McFadden, Irish politician
 Patricia McFadden, Swazi radical feminist
 Reece McFadden, Professional Boxer and double Commonwealth Medalist
 Steve McFadden, English actor
 Susan McFadden, Irish singer and actress
 Tarvarus McFadden (born 1997), American football player
 Tatyana McFadden (born 1989), American Paralympian athlete
 Tom McFadden, American actor
 Trevor N. McFadden, U.S. District Court judge
 W. H. McFadden, American oil executive

References

See also
 Fadden (disambiguation)
 McFadyen (disambiguation)
 MacFadyen

Surnames of Irish origin
Scottish surnames
Patronymic surnames